Theophilus is a male given name with a range of alternative spellings. Its origin is the Greek word Θεόφιλος from θεός (God) and φιλία (love or affection) can be translated as "Love of God" or "Friend of God", i.e., it is a theophoric name, synonymous with the name Amadeus which originates from Latin, Gottlieb in German and Bogomil in Slavic.
Theophilus may refer to:

People

Arts
 Theophilus Cibber (1703–1758), English actor, playwright, author, son of the actor-manager Colley Cibber
 Theophilus Clarke (1776?–1831), English painter
 Theophilos Hatzimihail (ca. 1870–1934), Greek folk painter from Lesbos
 Theophilus Presbyter (1070–1125), Benedictine monk, and author of the best-known medieval "how-to" guide to several arts, including oil painting — thought to be a pseudonym of Roger of Helmarshausen

Historical
 Theophilos (emperor) (800 to 805–842), Byzantine Emperor (reigned 829–842), the second of the Phrygian dynasty
 Theophilus (geographer), ancient Greek geographer
 Theophilus (jurist) (fl. 533), one author of the Institutes of Justinian
 Theophilos (king), Indo-Greek king who ruled c. 90 BC
 Theophilus of Edessa (695–785), medieval astrologer and scholar
 Theophilos Erotikos (10th century), Byzantine jurist and geometer
 Theophilus Protospatharius, (c. 7th century), Byzantine medical writer

Politics
 Theophilus Bradbury (1739–1803), U.S. Representative from Massachusetts
 Theophilus Eugene Connor (1897–1973), Birmingham, Alabama's notorious Commissioner of Public Safety during the American Civil Rights Movement
 Theophilus Danjuma (born 1938), influential Nigerian soldier and politician
 Theophilus Eaton (1590–1658), merchant, farmer, Puritan colonial leader, co-founder and first governor of New Haven Colony, Connecticut
 Theophilus Howard, 2nd Earl of Suffolk (1584–1640), English nobleman and politician
 Theophilus F. Metcalf (1816–1891), American farmer and politician
 Theophilus Shepstone (1817–1893), British South African statesman
 Theophilus Williams (1824–1904), mayor of Ballarat

Military
 Theophilos Erotikos (fl. 1034–1042), Byzantine general and governor, rebel in Cyprus
 Theophilus H. Holmes (1804–1880), Confederate general in the American Civil War
 Theophilos Kourkouas (920–970), Byzantine general, grandfather of emperor John I Tzimiskes
 Theophilus Weeks (1708–1772), soldier in the French and Indian War

Religious
 Patriarch Theophilus (disambiguation)
 Theophilus (biblical), person to whom the Gospel of Luke and the Acts of the Apostles were addressed
 Theophilus of Antioch (died c. 183), Christian apologist and Patriarch of Antioch
 Theophilus, bishop of Caesarea (fl. 195)
 Theophilus the Deacon, martyr from Libya
 Theophilus (bishop of the Goths), first known Gothic bishop, participant of the First Council of Nicaea in 325
 Theophilos the Indian (fl. 354–364), Arian bishop, also called "The Ethiopian", probably from the Maldive Islands
 Pope Theophilus of Alexandria (died c. 412), 23rd Pope of Alexandria
 Theophilus of Adana (fl. 538), bishop who made a pact with the devil
 Theophilus Presbyter (1070–1125), Benedictine monk, author, metallurgist, artist and armourer — thought to be a pseudonym of Roger of Helmarshausen
 Theophilus Gale (1628–1678), English nonconformist divine
 Theophilus Gates (1787–1846), American religious leader

 Theophilus Lindsey (1723–1808), English theologian
 Theophilus, martyr and saint (see Dorothea of Caesarea)
 Theophilus of Kiev, monk and saint — see Abraham and Onesimus of Kiev
 Theophilus ben Ananus, High Priest of Israel.

Music
 Theophilus London (born 1987), Trinidadian-American vocalist
 Theophilus Martins (born 1987), American rapper, DJ, and model

Other
 Theophilus Carter (1824–1904), British inventor and furniture dealer
 Theophilus Cazenove (1740–1811), Dutch financier and one of the agents of the Holland Land Company
 Theophilus Metcalfe (c 1610–c 1645), English stenographer
 Theophilus Redwood (1806–1892), Welsh pharmacist

Fictional characters
 Theophilus, a pagan lawyer supposedly converted by Saint Dorothea of Caesarea at the scene of her execution
 Theophilus, one of Leibniz's interlocutors in his book New Essays on Human Understanding
 Professor Theophilus Branestawm, the protagonist of the Professor Branestawm series of children's books
 Theophilus Goon, a policeman in Enid Blyton's Five Find-Outers series of children's mystery novels
 Dr. Theophilus Grantly, in Anthony Trollope's novel Barchester Towers
 Theophilus Msimangu, in Alan Paton's Cry, the Beloved Country
 The title character of Theophilus North, the last novel written by Thornton Wilder, first published in 1973
 Dr. Theophilus Tanner, from the Deathlands series of books
 Theophilus Thistle, in a noted tongue-twister
 Theophilus P. Wildebeeste, created by Lenny Henry
 The title character of Theophilus (comic strip), a religious comic strip published 1966–2002
 The title character of Theofilos (film), a 1987 Greek film about painter Theofilos Hatzimichail

See also
 Theofelus, surname and given name
 Theophil, a given name
 Teófilo, a given name
 Theophilia, the love or favour of God
 Jedediah, a given name also meaning "Friend of God"
 Godwin (disambiguation), the equivalent Anglo-Saxon name
 , the Icelandic form of the name

Greek masculine given names
Given names of Greek language origin